Shinga may refer to:

Places
 Shinga Deuxième a village in East Kasai in the Democratic Republic of the Congo	
 Shinga, DR Congo a village in Katanga Province of the Democratic Republic of the Congo
 Shienga, a village, also known as Shinga, in the Northern Region of Ghana
 Shinga, Jigawa State, a town in Jigawa State, Nigeria
 Shinga, Gombe State, a town in Gombe State, Nigeria	
 Shinga, Peru, a village in Departamento de Huanuco, Peru	
 Shinga, Zimbabwe, a village in Mashonaland East Province, Zimbabwe

Other
 For the fictional underground  creature created by Terry Goodkind and called a shinga, see The Sword of Truth